Caffrocrambus democritus is a moth in the family Crambidae. It was described by Graziano Bassi in 1994. It is found in the Democratic Republic of the Congo.

References

Crambinae
Moths described in 1994
Moths of Africa
Endemic fauna of the Democratic Republic of the Congo